The following is a list of events affecting Philippine television in 1997. Events listed include television show debuts, finales, cancellations, and channel launches, closures and rebrandings, as well as information about controversies and carriage disputes.

Premieres

Unknown
 Beverly Hills, 90210 on Studio 23 (now S+A 23)
 Baywatch on Studio 23 (now S+A 23)
 The Nanny on Studio 23 (now S+A 23)
 Aawitan Kita on GMA 7
 Solbrain on ABC 5
 VR Troopers on ABC 5
 Masked Rider on ABC 5
 The Final Report on PTV 4
 Klik na Klik sa Trese on IBC 13
 Details 0923 on IBC 13
 Sky Ranger Gavan on RPN 9
 Pobre Niña Rica on GMA 7
 Walang Kukurap on GMA 7
 Bitoy's Adventures in Bilibkaba? on GMA 7
 Gillage People on GMA 7
 Jamming on GMA 7
 Next on GMA 7
 Tuesday Viva Presentations on GMA 7
 Cinema Cinema Cinema on RPN 9
 Julie on ABS-CBN 2
 Zambo Jambo on ABS-CBN TV-3 Zamboanga
 TV Innovations on Citynet 27 (now GTV 27)
 TV Patrol Davao on ABS-CBN TV-4 Davao

Programs transferring networks

Finales
 January 3: Lyra on GMA 7
 January 25: Star Circle National Teen Quest on ABS-CBN 2
 January 26: GMA Supershow on GMA 7
 February 14: Mara Clara on ABS-CBN 2
 February 21: Teysi ng Tahanan on ABS-CBN 2
 March 7: Maria Mercedes on ABS-CBN 2
 April 3: Okay Ka, Fairy Ko! on GMA 7
 April 4: Business Today on GMA 7
 April 11: Ang TV on ABS-CBN 2
 May 4: Showbiz Lingo on ABS-CBN 2
 May 12: The Maricel Drama Special on ABS-CBN 2
 May 29: GMA True Stories on GMA 7
 June 15: The Sharon Cuneta Show on ABS-CBN 2
 June 17: Abangan Ang Susunod Na Kabanata on ABS-CBN 2
 June 29: Super Games on GMA 7
 August 15:
 IBC TV X-Press on IBC 13
 Mia Gracia on GMA 7
 September 12: Valiente
 September 24: Inside Showbiz on GMA 7
 October 6: Gillage People on GMA 7
 October 7: Mixed N.U.T.S. (Numero Unong Terrific Show!) on GMA
 October 31: Gym Team on ABS-CBN 2
 November 16: Ready, Get Set, Go! on ABS-CBN 2

Unknown
 Pamilya Ukay-Ukay on ABS-CBN 2
 Carol En Cosme on ABS-CBN 2
 Ilusiones on ABS-CBN 2
 Lazos de Amor on ABS-CBN 2
 Beverly Hills, 90210 on ABS-CBN 2
 Baywatch on ABS-CBN 2
 The Nanny on ABS-CBN 2
 Spice Boys on ABS-CBN 2
 Earthlink on ABS-CBN 2
 Lihim ng Gabi on GMA 7

 Jamming on GMA 7
 Vilma Tonight: A Limited Engagement on GMA 7
 Bilibitornot on GMA 7
 MU on GMA 7
 Channel S on GMA 7
 Pobre Niña Rica on GMA 7
 MVP: Monday Viva Presentations on GMA 7
 B na B: Baliw na Baliw on ABC 5
 Good Evening Please on ABC 5
 PSE Live: The Stock Market Today on IBC 13
 Ikaw ang Humatol on IBC 13
 Mga Himala at Gintong Aral ng El Shaddai on IBC 13
 Machineman on IBC 13
 Sky Ranger Gavan on IBC 13
 Tell The People on RPN 9
 Cinema Cinema on RPN 9
 Nap Knock on RPN 9
 Home TV Shopping on RJTV 29
 Dance Upon a Time with Becky Garcia on RJTV 29
 Quantum Showcase on Citynet 27 (now GTV 27)
 TV Patrol Mindanao on ABS-CBN TV-4 Davao

Channels

Launches
 September 3 – Arirang TV
 September 21 – AXN Asia
 November 30 – Hallmark Channel Asia

Births
January 20 – Kim Michael Last, That's My Bae contestant
January 27 - Angelica Nikka Javier, actor, dancer and TV Host
February 15 – Kit Thompson, actor
February 17 – Kenzo Gutierrez, actor, TV commercial, print and ramp model, football player and college student
March 10 – Julia Barretto, actress
March 13 – Lou Yanong
May 1 – Miles Ocampo, actress
May 6 – Maymay Entrata, model, singer, composer, dancer and actress
May 23 - Nikki Bagaporo, actress
June 17 - Jameson Blake, actor, dancer and TV Host
June 26 - Joshua Cadeliña, actor and singer
June 20 - Edmond Francisco, actor, dancer and TV Host
July 31 – Barbie Forteza, actress and dancer
September 16 – Julian Marcus Trono, actor
September 22 – Maris Racal, actress, singer and dancer
October 7 – Joshua Garcia, actor
October 4 – Michelle Vito, actress
October 12 - Jimboy Martin, actor
October 20 – Manolo Pedrosa, actor and student
October 22 – Kiara Takahashi
October 23 – Harlene Delgado, Broadcaster
November 4 – Bea Binene, actress, broadcast journalist and TV Host
November 17 - Jennifer Buencamino, actress, singer, dancer and TV Host
December 4 – Ruru Madrid, actor
December 7- Edward Kyle Secades, actor and dancer
December 17 – Jazz Ocampo, actress
December 18 – Mikee Quintos, actress and singer
December 19 - Maria Fabiana, actress, TV Host & Model
December 24 – Diana Mackey, actress

Deaths
April 6 – Max Alvarado, 68, actor (born February 19, 1929)
July 3 – Chiquito, 65, actor and comedian (born March 12, 1932)
October 11 – Dencio Padilla, 68, actor and comedian (born May 7, 1929)
December 31 – Gerard Fainsan, 23, singer, actor and member Universal Motion Dancers (born January 20, 1974)

See also
1997 in television

 
Television in the Philippines by year
Philippine television-related lists